Wang Jinghong  (died  1434) was a Ming dynasty Chinese mariner, explorer, diplomat and fleet admiral, who was deputy to Zheng He on his treasure voyages to Southeast Asia, South Asia, and East Africa, from 1405 to 1433. He led an eighth voyage to Sumatra but is said to have died in a shipwreck on the way. He was buried at Semarang in Java aged 78.

References 

15th-century Chinese people
Chinese Muslims
Chinese explorers
1430s deaths
Chinese admirals
History of Kerala
Ming dynasty eunuchs
Hui people
Year of birth unknown
Treasure voyages